

Incumbents

President and Vice President

Ministers and Coordinating Ministers

Coordinating Ministers

Ministers

Events

January 
 7–12 January – Papuan separatist rebels launches multiple attacks in Oksibil, sparking evacuations of civilians.
 8 January – An 11-year-old boy named Muhammad Fadli Sadewa in Makassar, South Sulawesi, was allegedly kidnapped and found dead.
 10 January 
 Papuan governor Lukas Enembe is arrested for alleged corruption case.
 A magnitude 7.5 earthquake strikes Maluku, damaging dozens of buildings.
 11 January – Government acknowledges 12 major human rights violations in the past.
 16 January – Indonesian court holds the first public hearing for the 2022 Kanjuruhan disaster.
 21 January – More than 100 are displaced after riots erupt in Dogiyai Regency, Highland Papua.
 29 January – Protest following slow response of Kanjuruhan disaster turns violent in Malang, injuring 3.
 Starting from early January to February – A series of chain messages and rumours regarding child abduction became widespread.

February 
 5 February – Motorcycle gang attacks and kills 1 citizen in Cimahi, then destroys a hotel.
 7 February – Nduga hostage crisis
 9 February – Four people are killed and several houses and buildings are destroyed by a 5.4 magnitude earthquake in Papua.
 13 February – Murder of Nofriansyah Yosua Hutabarat: Ferdy Sambo is found guilty of killing his adjutant, Nofriansyah Yosua Hutabarat, and is sentenced to death.
 16 February – Minister for State-Owned Enterprises Erick Thohir officially became the General Chairperson of PSSI for the 2023–2027 period during the KLB-PSSI event.
 20 February
 At least 4 are killed after a house storing fireworks explodes in Blitar, East Java.
 The son of Ministry of Finance official Mario Dandy Satriyo became a suspect and was detained for abusing David Ozora, the son of one of the GP Ansor central administrators.
 23 February – The Indonesian Prosperous Justice Party (PKS) officially endorses Anies Baswedan as a presidential candidate for the 2024 general elections.
 24–26 February – Indonesia has held the F1 Powerboat 2023, on Lake Toba, North Sumatra.
 25 February – At least 12 are killed during a riot in Wamena, Highland Papua.

March 

 2 March
 Democratic Party officially endorses Anies Baswedan as a presidential nominee for the 2024 elections.
 District court of Central Jakarta ordered postponement of 2024 elections.
 3 March – 2023 Plumpang oil depot fire: Seventeen people are killed and fifty others are injured by a fire in a fuel storage station in Koja, Jakarta.
 6 March – A series of landslide was triggered in Natuna Regency, resulting in 50 people missing.
 11 March – Merapi erupts. Eight villages are affected by volcanic ash.

References

External links 
 

 
Indonesia
Indonesia
2020s in Indonesia
Years of the 21st century in Indonesia